The Casma Province is one of twenty provinces of the Ancash Region of Peru.

Political division

Casma is divided into four districts, which are:

Ethnic groups 
The province is inhabited by indigenous citizens of Quechua descent. Spanish is the language which the majority of the population (85.95%) learnt to speak in childhood. 13.82% of the residents started speaking using the Quechua language (2007 Peru Census).

Sources

External links
  Official website of the Casma Province

Provinces of the Ancash Region